Triplophysa rotundiventris is a species of ray-finned fish in the genus Qinghaichthys, although these stone loaches are placed in the genus Qinghaichthys by some authorities. It was described from a specimens taken in the Jiegu He, a tributary of upper Yangtze in the Yushu Tibetan Autonomous Prefecture, China.

Footnotes 
 

rotundiventris
Fish described in 1979